English county histories, in other words historical and topographical (or "chorographical") works concerned with individual ancient counties of England, were produced by antiquarians from the late 16th century onwards. The content was variable: most focused on recording the ownership of estates and the descent of lordships of manors, thus the genealogies of county families, heraldry and other antiquarian material. In the introduction to one typical early work of this style, The Antiquities of Warwickshire published in 1656, the author William Dugdale writes:

Thus his work was designed primarily to be read by his fellow county gentry of Warwickshire, whose public lives and marriages were largely confined within their own county of residence, which they administered as Justices of the Peace and Sheriffs, and represented in Parliament. The genealogical and heraldic tradition continues with the series of Victoria County Histories commenced in the late 19th century.

Other forms recorded archaeological sites. A closely related genre, which emerged in the second half of the 17th century, was the county "Natural History", which focused on the county's flora, fauna and natural phenomena, but which also often included chapters on antiquities. The best known examples were Robert Plot's two volumes on Oxfordshire (1677) and Staffordshire (1686); and John Aubrey's unpublished work on Wiltshire.

Development

Continental models
Dugdale quotes as his foreign models César de Nostredame (1553–1629), historian of Provence in France, author of Rerum antiquarum et nobiliorum Provinciae, written c.1560, published 1615; Ottavio Rossi, historian of Brescia in Italy, author of Memorie Bresciane, Opera Historica, E Simbolica (1626);  Guillaume Catel (1560–1626), historian of Languedoc in France, author of Mémoires sur l'histoire du Languedoc (1633); Samuel Guichenon (1607–1664), historian of Bresse in France, author of  Histoire de la Bresse et du Bugey (1650) and Antonius Sanderus (1586–1664), historian of Flanders, author of Flandria Illustrata (1641).

English pioneers
William Lambarde's Perambulation of Kent (completed 1570; published 1576) is generally acknowledged as the first example of the genre in England. It was followed by Richard Carew's Survey of Cornwall (1602), and William Burton's Description of Leicester Shire (1622), as well as a number of other projects (such as those of Sir William Pole, Thomas Westcote, and Tristram Risdon in Devon, and Sampson Erdeswicke in Staffordshire) which, although they sometimes circulated in manuscript, did not come to completion or publication. Following the appearance of William Dugdale's Antiquities of Warwickshire (1656), a pattern was set. In the nineteenth century John Bowyer Nichols followed the line of a history of Leicestershire compiled by his father John Nichols, and saw numerous counties histories through the press at his printing firm. The scope of county histories varied, but the titles became quite standard: "Antiquities of", "Worthies of", "Geological survey", "Description of", later "Directory of", all could indicate the intention of producing a "history", a term that only in later times acquired the narrower meaning it carries today. Chorography, topography and toponymy might all be involved. Materials and collections for their counties were made by antiquaries, but publication might await sponsorship or enough subscriptions, as well as a capable author who would make a readable book, perhaps of multiple volumes, from notes.

Listing by county

Bedfordshire
See: History of Bedfordshire; :Category: History of Bedfordshire;

Magna Britannia (1806)
Victoria County History three volumes, 1904–1912

Berkshire
Elias Ashmole, Antiquities of Berkshire (1719)
 J. Rocque, A Topographical Survey of the County of Berkshire, 1761

Buckinghamshire
See: History of Buckinghamshire; :Category: History of Buckinghamshire; Victoria County History edited by William Page
George Lipscomb, The History and Antiquities of the County of Buckingham published in eight parts, 1831–47 
James Joseph Sheahan, History and Topography of Buckinghamshire: comprising a general survey of the county, preceded by an epitome of the early history of Great Britain (1862)

Cambridgeshire
Edmund Carter, History of the County of Cambridge (1753)

Cheshire
Sir Peter Leycester, 1st Baronet, Historical antiquities (1673)
Peter Perez Burdett, Survey of the County Palatine of Chester (1772)
George Ormerod, The History of the County Palatine and City of Chester (1816–19)

Cornwall
Richard Carew, The Survey of Cornwall (1602)
William Hals, Compleat History of Cornwall, from about 1750
An historical survey of the county of Cornwall, etc., compiled by William Penaluna
Richard Polwhele, The History of Cornwall (7 vols. 1803–08, revised 1816)
Daniel Lysons and Samuel Lysons, Magna Britannia

The Cornwall history was supported by Francis Vyvyan Jago Arundell.

Charles Sandoe Gilbert, Historical Survey of the County of Cornwall (2 vols., 1817–20)
Fortescue Hitchins and Samuel Drew, The History of Cornwall (1824)

Cumberland and Westmorland
Richard Burn and Joseph Nicolson, The History and Antiquities of the Counties of Westmorland and Cumberland, 1777.

This goes back to the manuscript Accompt of the most considerable estates and families in the county of Cumberland of about 1603 by John Denton. Through copies made by Daniel Fleming, it used material collected by Christopher Rawlinson. Joseph Nicolson (born 1706, baptised William – 1777), son of John Nicolson of Hawkesdale, was a nephew of Bishop William Nicolson, and inherited from him collections relating to Carlisle. Burn and Nicolson used in particular material collected by Thomas Machell, vicar of Kirkby Thore, and collated by William Nicolson.

William Hutchinson, History of the County of Cumberland (1794).

Derbyshire
Stephen Glover, Directory of the County of Derby (1827–29); and History of the County of Derby (1829–31)

Glover made use of, and expanded, an unpublished history by William Woolley.

Samuel Bagshaw, History, Gazetteer and Directory of Derbyshire (1846)
White, History, Gazetteer and Directory of the County of Derby (1857)

Devon
John Hooker, Synopsis Corographical of the County of Devon (c. 1587), unpublished
Sir William Pole (d. 1635), Collections Towards a Description of the County of Devon, notes made (c. 1608–1617), published by Sir John-William de la Pole (ed.), London, 1791 
Thomas Westcote, Survey of Devon of 1630
Tristram Risdon, Chorographical Description or Survey of the County of Devon (c. 1632)
Richard Polwhele, The History of Devonshire (1793–1806)

John Swete supplied material to Polwhele.

William White, History, Gazetteer and Directory of the County of Devon: including the city of Exeter, and comprising a general survey of the county

Dorset
John Hutchins, History and Antiquities of Dorset (1774)
John Hutchins, The History and Antiquities of the County of Dorset, Vols. 1–4, 1815.

Durham
William Hutchinson, History and Antiquities of the Country Palatine of Durham
Robert Surtees, The History and Antiquities of the County Palatine of Durham

Both Hutchinson and Surtees drew on the work of George Allan. John Brewster assisted Surtees.

James Raine, The History and Antiquities of North-Durham, 1852
William Fordyce, The History and Antiquities of the County Palatine of Durham
Whellan, History, Topography, and Directory of the County Palatine of Durham (1856)

Essex
Philip Morant, The History and Antiquities of the County of Essex, two volumes 1763–1768

Morant used collections of Thomas Jekyll; and also material from Richard Symonds he obtained via Gregory King. A major source was the parish descriptions of William Holman. These had been acquired by Nicholas Tindal, for whom Morant worked as a curate; Tindal made a small start on publishing Essex history, around 1732. They then passed via Nathaniel Salmon, Anthony Allen and John Booth, before Morant had them from Booth about 1750.

A New and Complete History of Essex, from a late survey (1772)
Elizabeth Ogborne, The History of Essex (1817, one volume only)

Thomas Leman and probably Joseph Strutt assisted.

William White, History, Gazetteer and Directory of the County of Essex, 1848

Gloucestershire
Sir Robert Atkyns, The Ancient and Present State of Glostershire (1712)
Samuel Rudder, A New History of Gloucestershire (1779)

Rudder's work was based on Atkyns and a manuscript of Richard Furney.

Ralph Bigland, Historical, Monumental & Genealogical Collections relative to the County of Gloucester (1791–94)
Thomas Rudge, The History of the County of Gloucester, compressed and brought down to the year 1803 (1803)
Thomas Dudley Fosbroke, Abstracts of Records and Manuscripts Respecting the County of Gloucester (1807)
Gloucestershire Victoria County History

Hampshire
William Bingley, The Topographical Account of the Hundred of Bosmere (fragment) 1817
William White, History, gazetteer and directory of the County of Hampshire (1859; 2nd edition 1878)

Herefordshire
John Duncumb, partial work (1804–12) continued by others.

Duncumb used work by Richard Blyke; and an older manuscript by Silas Taylor (Domville).

Hertfordshire
See: History of Hertfordshire; :Category:History of Hertfordshire; Victoria County History
John Norden, Speculi Britaniae Pars: the Description of Hartfordshire (1598)
Henry Chauncy, Antiquities of Hertfordshire (1700)
Nathaniel Salmon, History of Hertfordshire (1728)

Salmon drew on unpublished material of Chauncy.

Robert Clutterbuck, The History and Antiquities of the County of Hertford (1815–27)

Clutterbuck used collections of Thomas Blore.

John Edwin Cussans, A History of Hertfordshire, containing an account of the Descents of the various Manors, Pedigrees of Families, Antiquities, Local Customs, &c. (16 parts in three folio volumes, 1870–81)

Kent
William Lambarde, A Perambulation of Kent (completed 1570; published 1576)
Richard Kilburne, A Brief Survey of the County of Kent (1657) [a summary digest of parishes]; and A Topographie, or Survey of the County of Kent (1659)
Thomas Philipot, Villare Cantianum: or Kent Surveyed and Illustrated (1659)
Philipot drew on materials originally collected by his father, John Philipot, and the Villare Cantianum is sometimes said to be John's work published under Thomas's name. He also drew on notes inherited from Robert Glover, his great-uncle.
Edward Hasted, The History and Topographical Survey of the County of Kent, (1st edn, 4 folio vols, 1778–99); (2nd edn, 12 octavo vols, 1797–1801)
Samuel Henshall, Specimens and parts; containing a history of the county of Kent and a dissertation on the laws (1798, partial)
Christopher Greenwood, An Epitome of County History Vol. 1 (1818)

Lancashire
Matthew Gregson, Portfolio of Fragments relative to the History and Antiquities of the County Palatine and Duchy of Lancaster (1817)
John Corry, History of Lancashire (1825)
Edward Baines, Directory and Gazetteer of the County of Lancaster (1824–25) and History of the County Palatine of Lancaster (1836).

Baines used Edwin Butterworth as researcher and author; he also took much from Gregson's Portfolio.

Leicestershire
William Burton, The Description of Leicester Shire (1622)

Burton made use of notes of Augustine Vincent.

John Nichols, The History and Antiquities of the County of Leicester. 4 vols. (1795–1815)

Nichols included unpublished material from William Burton, Francis Peck, and Richard Farmer.

William White, History, Gazetteer and Directory of Leicestershire, 1863

Lincolnshire
William Marrat, History of Lincolnshire (1814–16), incomplete
Thomas Allen, A History of the County of Lincoln (1833–34)

Middlesex
John Norden, Speculum Britanniae: the First Parte: an Historicall, & Chorographicall Discription of Middlesex (1593)

Norfolk
Anonymous, The Chorography of Norfolk (c.1602: unpublished)
Francis Blomefield, Topographical History of Norfolk (1739–45) 

Blomefield used materials from Peter Le Neve and Thomas Martin of Palgrave. Charles Parkin worked to complete the history. Blomefield used material collected by Antony Norris, who later worked on completing and revising the history with John Fenn.

Anonymous, History and Antiquities of the County of Norfolk (1781)

By Crouse and Booth of Norwich, this was largely copied from Blomefield.

John Chambers, A General History of the County of Norfolk (1829)

Northamptonshire
John Morton, The Natural History of Northamptonshire, with some account of the antiquities; to which is annexed a transcript of Domesday Book (1712)
Peter Whalley, The History and Antiquities of Northamptonshire. Compiled from the manuscript collections of the late learned antiquary, John Bridges, Esq. (1762–1791)

This resulted from a project started by John Bridges, and took several generations to come to fruition.

George Baker, History and Antiquities of the County of Northampton (1822–30)

Northumberland
John Wallis, The Natural History and Antiquities of Northumberland, and so much of the County of Durham as lies between the rivers Tyne and Tweed, commonly called North Bishoprick (2 vols., 1769).
Eneas Mackenzie, An Historical and Descriptive View of the County of Northumberland (1811, 2 vols. and revised 1825); and A Descriptive and Historical Account of the Town and County of Newcastle-upon-Tyne (1827, 2 vols.)
John Hodgson, History of Northumberland (unfinished, from 1825)
John Hodgson Hinde, A History of Northumberland (1858)
History of the County of Northumberland (15 volumes 1893–1940). This was issued by the Northumberland County History Committee.

Nottinghamshire
Robert Thoroton, Antiquities of Nottinghamshire, 1677
John Throsby, Antiquities of Nottinghamshire, 1790

Oxfordshire
Robert Plot, The Natural History of Oxford-shire (1677)

Rutland
James Wright, The History and Antiquities of the County of Rutland (1684)
Thomas Blore, History and Antiquities of the County of Rutland (1811, partial)

Shropshire
Charles Hulbert, History of the County of Salop (1837)

This included an edition of the 1779 History and Antiquities of Shrewsbury by Thomas Phillips, which drew on the work of James Bowen and John Bowen.

Thomas Farmer Dukes, Antiquities of Shropshire (1844)

Dukes used a manuscript of Edward Lloyd.

Somerset
John Collinson (1791, 3 vols.) including survey by Edmund Rack
Somerset Victoria County History

Staffordshire
Sampson Erdeswicke, Survey of Staffordshire
Robert Plot, The Natural History of Staffordshire (1686)
Stebbing Shaw, History of Staffordshire (History and Antiquities of Staffordshire)
William Pitt, A Topographical History of Staffordshire (1817)

Suffolk
Anonymous, The Chorography of Suffolk (1602: unpublished)
Robert Reyce, A Breviary of Suffolk (c.1618: unpublished)
John Gage Rokewode, The History and Antiquities of Suffolk, 1838
Alfred Suckling, The History and Antiquities of the County of Suffolk (1846) 
M. R. James, Suffolk and Norfolk: A Perambulation of the Two Counties with Notices of Their History and Their Ancient Buildings (1930)

Surrey
John Aubrey, Perambulation of Surrey (written 1673–92); published by Richard Rawlinson as The Natural History and Antiquities of the County of Surrey (1718–19)
Owen Manning and William Bray, The History and Antiquities of the County of Surrey (1804–14)
Edward Wedlake Brayley with Gideon Algernon Mantell (geology), A Topographical History of Surrey (1841)

Sussex
James Dallaway, History of the Western Division of Sussex (1815 to 1832), with Edmund Cartwright
Thomas Walker Horsfield, The History, Antiquities and Topography of the County of Sussex (1835)
John Russell Smith, Sussex archaeological collections illustrating the history and antiquities of the county, 1853

Warwickshire
William Dugdale, The Antiquities of Warwickshire (1656)

Dugdale used notes from William Burton; and much material from Simon Archer.

Wiltshire
John Aubrey, Antiquities of Wiltshire (written 1656–71; partially published 1862); and Naturall Historie of Wiltshire (written 1656–91; partially published 1847)
Sir Richard Colt Hoare, The History of Modern Wiltshire (1822–44)
Wiltshire Victoria County History
Wiltshire Archaeological and Natural History Magazine

Worcestershire
Treadway Russell Nash, History and Antiquities of the County of Worcester (1781)

Nash used collections of Charles Lyttelton, including older research of Thomas Habington. He also was aware of the work of Thomas Dingley.

Yorkshire
Ralph Thoresby, using collections of John Hopkinson
Memoirs Illustrative of the History and Antiquities of the County and City of York (1816)
Joseph Hunter, South Yorkshire (a history of the Deanery of Doncaster) (1828–31)
Edward Baines, History, Directory and Gazetteer of the County of York (1822–23)
Thomas Allen, A New and Complete History of the County of York (1828–31)
The Survey of the County of York, John de Kirkby, 1866

Related histories

Worthies
Thomas Fuller, Worthies of England
John Prince, Worthies of Devon
Hartley Coleridge, Worthies of Yorkshire and Lancashire (1836)
Mark Antony Lower, Worthies of Sussex (1865)
Cornelius Brown, Worthies of Notts
Winnifrith Alfred, Men of Kent and Kentish men: biographical notices of 680 worthies of Kent
Henry Lonsdale  The Worthies of Cumberland (1867)
George Atkinson, The Worthies of Westmorland
Browne, Edith Ophelia; Burton, John Richard (editors). A short biography of the Worthies of Worcestershire

Urban and parish histories
Histories were also written of cities, ancient boroughs, newer municipalities, and even individual parishes (parochial histories).

John Stow, The Survey of London (1598 and 1603)
Francis Drake, Eboracum: The History and Antiquities of the City of York, from its Original to the Present Time; together with the History of the Cathedral Church and the Lives of the Archbishops (1736)
W. Newton, The History and Antiquities of Maidstone (1741)
Philip Morant, The History and Antiquities of Colchester (1748)
Thomas Warton, The History and Antiquities of Kiddington (1782)
William Barrett, History and Antiquities of Bristol (1788)
John Throsby, The History and Antiquities of the Ancient Town of Leicester (1791)
John Brewster, Parochial History and Antiquities of Stockton-on-Tees (1796)
John Blackner, History of Nottingham (1815)
Thomas Walker Horsfield, The History and Antiquities of Lewes (1824–26)
James Thompson, History of Leicester (1849–71)
Pishey Thompson, The History and Antiquities of Boston  (1856)
Richard Vickerman Taylor, The Biographia Leodiensis; or, Biographical Sketches of the Worthies of Leeds and neighbourhood, from the Norman Conquest to the present time, etc.(1865–67)
Howard Dudley, The History and Antiquities of Horsham
Thomas Faulkner, History and Antiquities of Hammersmith

See also
Chorography
English local history
General View of Agriculture county surveys
Popular County Histories book series
Alan Ball Local History Awards

Notes

Bibliography

English antiquarians
Regional geography
English history-related lists
English local history